Niederle is a surname. Notable people with the surname include:

Ivo Niederle, Czech actor, entertainer, and commentator
Lubor Niederle (1865–1944), Czech archeologist, anthropologist, and ethnographer
Muriel Niederle (born  1970), American economist
Walter Niederle (born 1921), Austrian field hockey player